Breathing Underwater is the third studio album and second international studio album by American singer Marié Digby. It was released in Japan on June 24, 2009 and was released on September 7, 2009 on Amazon and on September 15, 2009 in the US and worldwide.

Album leak 
On April 8, 2009, "Breathing Underwater" was leaked onto the internet, months prior to the new September release date.

On April 9, 2009, Digby responded on her MySpace page to those concerned about the leak:

"Yesterday, my album advance was sent only to the folks at my record label, radio DJ's and music supervisors. It is just inevitable that one of those people are going to try and make a buck or put up the music just for their own personal satisfaction. [...] If you can't afford 8 dollars for an album, then you can always support your favorite artists by even just purchasing a song or two! If an artist I love had made a new album and it was on the internet, I would probably want it too !! But I would undoubtedly go and buy the album with pride on the date of release as well.. but that's just me :)"

Track listing

Singles

Digital singles 
The album's lead U.S. single "Avalanche" was released on April 13, 2009. On September 21, 2009. A music video for Avalanche was posted on Marié's official YouTube. Another video was made for Asian countries, which is identical to the YouTube version but cuts out the behind-the-scenes clips and focuses more on the performance.

"Symphony", the album's second follow-up U.S. single was released on June 2, 2009. The song was used at the season 6 finale of The Hills.

Promotional singles 
A Japanese promotional single, "Feel" was aired in Japan and a music video of it was posted to Marié's official YouTube on June 11, 2009. It was soon used as a promotion for her movie for the album.

Breathing Underwater, the movie
On July 1, 2010, Digby released her first movie. It was a 17-episode musical series entitled Breathing Underwater. The series became viewable through ABCLounge.com. The movie was about Digby's personal life and how she got to make her third album. The movie starred herself, some of her friends and actors. The movie was brought by Hollywood Records and StoryMusicStory.

Release history

Chart performance

References

External links 
 Breathing Underwater on Myspace
 [ All Music]
 Marié Fans
 Sweet Marié Digby - a Hong Kong fansite dedicated to Marié Digby and her work
 AArisings A-Profiler Interview Published March 25, 2008
 Nichi Bei Times Interview Published April 17, 2008

2009 albums
Albums produced by Brian Kennedy (record producer)
Hollywood Records albums
Marié Digby albums
Avex Group albums
Techno albums by American artists